Betsy Rue (born May 7, 1979) is a retired American actress.

Career
Rue is best known for her works in feature films and television. She portrayed Irene in My Bloody Valentine 3D (2009), Strawberrius in Miss March (2009), Jazlean Benny in Halloween II (2009), and Ashley Saint in Lucky Bastard (2013). Her work in television includes appearing on the shows Unfabulous, How I Met Your Mother, According to Jim, True Blood, Femme Fatales, Eastwick and iCarly.

Personal life
In 2012, she married her husband Aron Reynolds. They have twin daughters who were born in September 2015.

Filmography

Film

Television

Discography

Singles

References

External links

1979 births
American film actresses
American television actresses
Living people
21st-century American actresses